Donaldson Smith's nightjar (Caprimulgus donaldsoni) is a species of nightjar in the family Caprimulgidae. It is found in Ethiopia, Kenya, Somalia, and Tanzania.

References

Donaldson Smith's nightjar
Birds of the Horn of Africa
Donaldson Smith's nightjar
Taxonomy articles created by Polbot